Chirashree Anchan is an Indian actress who appears in Tulu, Kannada, Telugu and Tamil movies.

Early life

Chirashree Anchan was born in a Tulu speaking Billava family in Mangalore to Madhusoodan Anchan and Poornima Madhu.

Film career
She debuted in coastal wood movie Pavithra (2016) which run successfully in the box office and next acted in Prajwal Kumar Attavar directorial Rambarooti (2016). Chirashree got signed for Telugu and Kannada movie Aame Athadaithe (2016) and Kalpana 2 (2016) respectively.

Chirashree was seen in the Aravind Kaushik directorial Huliraaya(2017).  Her next Kannada movie was Udumba. Chirashree made her Tamil debut in Aghavan.

She also played a lead role in the Telugu movie Duppatlo minnagu (2019) Directed by Yendamuri Veerendranath.

Filmography

Award
Chirashree awarded 'Viewers Choice Best Actress' award for 2016 at a popular Tulu film awards event. Chirashree also bagged best actress award for her debut movie Pavithra at Red FM film awards in the year 2018.

References

Sources
Chirashree Anchan's "Huliraya" opens to good response - See and Say English

Aame Athadaithe - Rediff Pages 
Chirashree Anchan's "Huliraya" opens to good response - See and Say English  
VJ Vineeth to romance Chirashree Anchan in bilingual - See and Say English  
Aame Athadaithe - Rediff Pages

External links 

Living people
Indian film actresses
Actresses in Tulu cinema
Tulu people
Mangaloreans
Actresses from Mangalore
Year of birth missing (living people)
Actresses in Tamil cinema
Actresses in Telugu cinema
Actresses in Kannada cinema